Offender profiling, also known as criminal profiling, is an investigative strategy used by law enforcement agencies to identify likely suspects and has been used by investigators to link cases that may have been committed by the same perpetrator. Multiple crimes may be linked to a specific offender and the profile may be used to predict the identified offender's future actions. In the 1980s, most researchers believed offender profiling was relevant only to sex crimes, like serial rape or sexual homicide, but since the late 1990s, research has been published to support its application to arson (1998), and then later terrorism (2000) and burglary (2017).

Theory
Psychological profiling is described as a method of suspect identification which seeks to identify a person's mental, emotional, and personality characteristics based on things done or left at the crime scene.

There are two major assumptions made when it comes to offender profiling: behavioral consistency and homology. Behavior consistency is the idea that an offender's crimes will tend to be similar to one another. Homology is the idea that similar crimes are committed by similar offenders.

Fundamental assumptions that offender profiling relies upon, such as the homology assumption, have been proven outdated by advances in psychology and behavioral science. The majority of profiling approaches assume that behavior is primarily determined by personality, not situational factors, an assumption that psychological research has recognized as a mistake since the 1960s.

Profilers have been noted to be very reluctant to participate in studies of profiling's accuracy.

In a 2021 article it was noted that out of 243 cases, around 188 were solved with the help of criminal profiling 

Results of the famous “Coals to Newcastle” study found that the predictions made by profilers were accurate about 66% of the time. However, the profiles led to an arrest in just 5 of the 184 cases. In other words, there was just a 2.7% success rate when the profiles were applied out in the field.

Criticism 
, although the practice of offender profiling is widely used, publicized and researched globally, there is a significant lack of empirical research or evidence to support the validity of psychological profiling in criminal investigations. Critics question the reliability, validity, and utility of criminal profiles generally provided in police investigations. Even over the years common criminal profiling methods have changed and been looked down upon due to weak definitions that differentiate the criminal's behaviors, assumptions and their psychodynamic process of the offender actions and characteristics that occur. In other words, this leads to poor and misleading profiles on offenders because they are based on opinions and decisions made up from one profiler conducting research on the offender. Research in 2007-2008 into profiling's effectiveness have prompted researchers to label the practice as pseudoscientific. At the time, Malcolm Gladwell of The New Yorker compared profiling to astrology and cold reading. Other critics described criminal profiling as an investigative tool hidden behind a lack of scientific evidence and support.

Unregulated usage 
The profession of criminal profiling is highly unregulated. There is no governing body which determines who is and who is not qualified to be a criminal profiler, and therefore those who identify themselves as criminal profilers may range from someone with minimal to someone with extensive experience in the realm of criminal investigation. In addition to the lack of criteria as to what makes an expert in the field of criminal profiling, there is little empirical evidence supporting the accuracy of criminal profiling. There is an abundance of anecdotal support for criminal profiling, much of which originates from reports made by police officers and investigators regarding the performance of criminal profilers. However, law enforcement agents have been found to greatly support the use of criminal profiling, but studies have shown that detectives are poor profilers themselves. One study presented police officers with two different profiles for the same perpetrator, each of which varied greatly from the officers’ own description. It was found that the officers were unable to determine whether one profile was more accurate than the other, and felt that all profiles accurately described the perpetrator. Officers were able to find truth in whichever profile they viewed, believing it accurately described the perpetrator, demonstrating the presence of the Barnum effect. In addition, an investigator's judgement of the accuracy of a profile is impacted by the perceived source of the information; if the officer believes that the profile was written by an “expert” or “professional”, they are likely to perceive it as more accurate than a profile written by someone who is identified as a consultant. This poses a genuine problem when considering that there are no true criteria which determine who may be considered a “professional” criminal profiler, and when considering that support for criminal profiling is largely based on the opinion of police officers.

Typologies
The most routinely used typology in profiling is categorizing crime scenes, and by extension offender's personalities, as either "organized" or "disorganized". The idea of classifying crime scenes according to organized/disorganized dichotomy is credited to the FBI profiler Roy Hazelwood.

A typology of serial sexual homicides advocated by Robert Keppel and Richard Walter categorizes them as either power–assertive, power–reassurance, anger–retaliatory, or anger–excitation.

Criminal profiling can also be ex-ante or ex-post. Descriptive profiling of a perpetrator is a type of ex-post profiling, and can be used to prevent a serial killer from striking again.

Approaches
There are three leading approaches in the area of offender profiling: the criminal investigative approach, the clinical practitioner approach, and the scientific statistical approach. The criminal investigative approach is what is used by law enforcement and more specifically by the Behavioral Analysis Unit (BAU) within the FBI. The BAU "assists law enforcement agencies by their review and assessment of a criminal act, by interpreting the offender's behavior during the crime and the interactions between the offender and the victim during the commission of the crime and as expressed in the crime scene." The clinical practitioner approach focuses on looking at each case as unique, making the approach very individualistic. One practitioner, Turco, believed that all violent crimes were a result of the mother-child struggle where female victims represent the offender's mother. This is also recognized as the psychodynamic approach. Another practitioner, Copson, outlined some principles for profiling which include being custom made, interactive and reflexive. By following these principles, the profile should include advice that is unique and not from a stereotype, should be easy to understand for all levels of intelligence, and all elements in the profile should influence one another. The Scientific approach relies heavily on the multivariate analysis of behaviors and any other information from the crime scene that could lead to the offender's characteristics or psychological processes. According to this approach, elements of the profile are developed by comparing the results of the analysis to those of previously caught offenders.

Wilson, Lincon and Kocsis list three main paradigms of profiling: diagnostic evaluation, crime scene analysis, and investigative psychology. Ainsworth identified four: clinical profiling (synonymous with diagnostic evaluation), typological profiling (synonymous with crime scene analysis), investigative psychology, and geographical profiling.

Five steps in profiling include: One- Analyzing the criminal act and comparing it to similar crimes in the past. Two- An in-depth analysis of the actual crime scene, Three- Considering the victim's background and activities for possible motives and connections, Four- Considering other possible motives. Five- Developing a description of the possible offender that can be compared with previous cases.

One type of criminal profiling is referred to as linkage analysis. Gerard N. Labuschagne defines linkage analysis as "a form of behavioral analysis that is used to determine the possibility of a series of crimes as having been committed by one offender." Gathering many aspects of the offender's crime pattern such as modus operandi (MO), ritual or fantasy-based behaviors exhibited, and the signature of the offender, help to establish a basis for a linkage analysis. An offender's modus operandi is the habits or tendencies during the killing of the victim. An offender's signature is the unique similarities in each of the kills. Mainly, linkage analysis is used when physical evidence, such as DNA, cannot be collected.

Labuschagne states that in gathering and incorporating these aspects of the offender's crime pattern, investigators must engage in five assessment procedures: One- Obtaining data from multiple sources. Two- Reviewing the data and identifying significant features of each crime across the series. Three- Classifying the significant features as either modus operandi or ritualistic. Four- Comparing the combination of modus operandi and ritual or fantasy-based features across the series to determine if a signature exists. Five- Compiling a written report highlighting the findings.

FBI method 

There are six stages to developing a criminal profile: profiling inputs, decision process models, crime assessment, criminal profiling, investigation, and apprehension. The FBI and BAU tend to study specific categories of crimes such as white collar and serial murder.

History 

An Italian psychologist Cesare Lombroso (1835-1909) was a criminologist who attempted to formally classify criminals based on age, gender, physical characteristics, education, and geographic region. When comparing these similar characteristics, he better understood the origin of motivation of criminal behavior, and in 1876, he published the book The Criminal Man. Lombroso studied 383 Italian inmates. Based on his studies, he suggested that there were three types of criminals. There were born criminals, who were degenerates and insane criminals, who suffered from a mental illness. Also, he studied and found specific physical characteristics. A few examples included asymmetry of the face, eye defects and peculiarities, and ears of unusual size, etc.

One of the first offender profiles was assembled by detectives of the Metropolitan Police on the personality of Jack the Ripper, a serial killer who had murdered a series of prostitutes in the 1880s. Police surgeon Thomas Bond was asked to give his opinion on the extent of the murderer's surgical skill and knowledge. Bond's assessment was based on his own examination of the most extensively mutilated victim and the post mortem notes from the four previous canonical murders. In his notes, dated November 10, 1888, Bond mentioned the sexual nature of the murders coupled with elements of apparent misogyny and rage. Bond also tried to reconstruct the murder and interpret the behavior pattern of the offender. Bond's basic profile included that "The murderer must have been a man of physical strength and great coolness and daring... subject to periodic attacks of homicidal and erotic mania. The characters of the mutilations indicate that the man may be in a condition sexually, that may be called Satyriasis."

In 1912, a psychologist in Lackawanna, New York delivered a lecture in which he analyzed the unknown murderer of a local boy named Joey Joseph, dubbed "The Postcard Killer" in the press.

In 1932, Dr. Dudley Schoenfeld gave the authorities his predictions about the personality of the kidnapper of the Lindbergh baby.

In 1943, Walter C. Langer developed a profile of Adolf Hitler that hypothesized the Nazi dictator's response to various scenarios, including losing the war. The United States Office of Strategic Services asked William L. Langer's brother Walter C. Langer, a psychiatrist, to draw up a profile of Adolf Hitler and hypothesize their response to various scenarios including losing the World War II. After the World War II, British psychologist Lionel Haward, while working for the Royal Air Force police, drew up a list of characteristics which high-ranking war criminals might display. These characteristics were used to identify high-ranking war criminals amongst captured soldiers and airmen.

Offender profiling was first introduced to the FBI in the 1960s, when several classes were taught to the American Society of crime lab directors. There was little public knowledge of offender profiling until publicization with TV. Later films based on the fictional works of author Thomas Harris that caught the public eye as a profession in particular Manhunter (1986) and Silence of the Lambs (1991). The fastest development occurred when the FBI opened its training academy, the Behavioral Analysis Unit, in Quantico, Virginia. It led to the establishment of the National Center for the Analysis of Violent Crime and the Violent Criminal Apprehension Program.

James Brussel was a psychiatrist who rose to fame after his profile of New York City's "Mad Bomber" George Metesky was published in the New York Times in 1956. The media dubbed him "The Sherlock Holmes of the Couch." In his 1968 book Casebook of a Crime Psychiatrist, Brussel relates how he predicted that the bomber would wear a buttoned-up double-breasted suit, but edited out the many incorrect predictions he had made in his profile, claiming he had successfully predicted the bomber would be a Slav who lived in Connecticut, when he had actually predicted he would be "born and educated in Germany," and live in White Plains, New York. In 1964, Brussel profiled the Boston Strangler for the Boston Police Department.

In 1972, after the death of J. Edgar Hoover, who was skeptical of psychiatry, the Behavioral Science Unit of the FBI was formed by Patrick Mullany and Howard Teten.

Investigations of serial killers Ted Bundy and the Green River Killer were performed in 1974 by Robert Keppel and psychologist Richard Walter. They went on to develop the four subtypes of violent crime and the Hunter Integrated Telemetry System (HITS) database which compiled characteristics of violent crime for research.

At the FBI's BSU, Robert Ressler and John Douglas began an informal series of ad hoc interviews with 36 convicts starting in early 1978. Douglas and Ressler later created a typology of sexually motivated violent offenders and formed the National Center for the Analysis of Violent Crime.

The March 1980 issue of the FBI Law Enforcement Bulletin invited local police to request profiles from the FBI. An article in the April 1980 issue, "The Lust Murderer," introduced the dichotomy of "organized" and "disorganized" offenders. The August 1985 issue described a third, "mixed" category.

In 1985, Dr. David Canter in the United Kingdom profiled "Railway Rapists" John Duffy and David Mulcahy. David Canter assisted police detectives from the mid-1980s to an offender who had carried out a series of serious attacks, but Canter saw the limitations of offender profiling – in particular, the subjective, personal opinion of a psychologist. He and a colleague coined the term investigative psychology and began trying to approach the subject from what they saw as a more scientific point of view.

The Crime Classification Manual was published in 1992, and introduced the term "criminal investigative analysis."

In 1999, The percentage of accurate criminal profilers was only estimated to be at 21%, whereas in 2020 the accuracy was estimated to be at 86%.

Popularity

Profiling has continuously gotten more
accurate throughout the years. In the year 2008, only 42% of cases were solved using criminal profiling. In 2019 the FBI was able to solve 56% of the cases that were not solved back in the year 2008. 

Profiling as an investigative tool has a high level of acceptance among both the general public and police.

In the United States, between 1971 and 1981, the FBI had only profiled cases on 192 occasions. By 1986, FBI profilers were requested in 600 investigations in a single year. By 1996, 12 FBI profilers were applying profiling to approximately 1,000 cases per year.

In the United Kingdom, 29 profilers provided 242 instances of profiling advice between 1981 and 1994, its usage increasing steadily over that period.

The usage of profiling has been documented in Sweden, Finland, New Zealand, South Africa, Germany, Canada, Ireland, Malaysia, Russia, Zimbabwe, and the Netherlands.

Surveys of police officers in the United States, the United Kingdom, and Canada have found an overwhelming majority consider profiling to be useful. A 2007 meta-analysis of existing research into offender profiling noted that there was "a notable incongruity between [profiling's] lack of empirical foundation and the degree of support for the field."

Profiling's continued popularity has been speculatively attributed to broad use of anecdotes and testimonials, a focus on correct predictions over the number of incorrect ones, ambiguous profiles benefiting from the Barnum effect, and the popular appeal of the fantasy of a sleuth with deductive powers like Hercule Poirot and Sherlock Holmes.

Notable profilers 

Notable profilers include Roy Hazelwood, who profiled sexual predators; Ernst Gennat, a German criminologist, who developed an early profiling scheme for the police of Berlin; Walter Charles Langer, who predicted Hitler's behavior and eventual suicide; Howard Teten, who worked on the case of Martin Luther King Jr.'s assassination; and John E. Douglas, who worked on a wave of child murders in Atlanta in the 1980s.

According to the BAU the probability of a profiler being used as "expert testimony" in court and leading to a guilty verdict is 85%.
There is a difference between the hard sciences and the social sciences related to testimony and evidence in the courtroom. Some experts contend that offender profiling should not be used in court until such processes can be reliably validated, but as seen, it is still used successfully to this day.
The historical roots of criminal profiling in the United States and Europe have been discussed elsewhere (1). Many European countries have now developed their own approaches to criminal profiling and established specialized academic research institutions and trained police units (1,6), for
example, the German Bundeskriminalamt (7,8), implementing the first quality standards in 2003 (9,10), as well as Austria (11), Scandinavia (12), and the United Kingdom (13). Switzerland has only recently adopted ViCLAS, the computerized Violent Crime Linkage Analysis System, and is now training its own case analysis specialists (1,14,15)

Research 

In a review of the literature by Eastwood et al. (2006), one of the studies noted, Pinizzotto and Finkel (1990), showed that trained criminal profilers did not do any better than non-profilers in producing an accurate profile. A 2000 study also showed that profilers were not significantly better at creating a profile than any other participating groups.

A study showed there is an 83% success rate in criminal profiling. Looking at research from 2019-2020 regarding cases that had no real evidence pointing to anyone, and 83% of the time profilers were able to help assist in cases that lead to an arrest. Surveys of police officers in the United States, the United Kingdom, and Canada have found an overwhelming majority consider profiling to be useful.[11] A 2007 meta-analysis of existing research into offender profiling noted that there was "a notable incongruity between [profiling's] lack of empirical foundation and the degree of support for the field."[12]

Profiling's continued popularity has been speculatively attributed to broad use of anecdotes and testimonials, a focus on correct predictions over the number of incorrect ones, ambiguous profiles benefiting from the Barnum effect, and the popular appeal of the fantasy of a sleuth with deductive powers like Hercule Poirot and Sherlock Holmes.[10]

A survey of statements made in offender profiles done for major cases from 1992 to 2001 found that "72% included repetition of the details of what occurred in the offence (factual statements already known by the police), references to the profiler’s competence [...] or caveats about using the material in the investigation." Over 80% of the remaining statements, which made claims about the offender's characteristics, gave no justification for their conclusion.

A 2003 study which asked two different groups of police to rate how accurately a profile matched a description of the apprehended offender, with one group given a description of a completely fabricated offender instead of the real one, found that the profile was rated equally accurate in both cases.

There is a lack of clear, quantifiable evidence of a link between crime scene actions (A) and offender characteristics (C), a necessary supposition of the A to C paradigm proposed by Canter (1995). A 2002 review by Alison et al. concluded, "The notion that particular configurations of demographic features can be predicted from an assessment of particular configurations of specific behaviors occurring in short-term, highly traumatic situations seems an overly ambitious and unlikely possibility. Thus, until such inferential processes can be reliably verified, such claims should be treated with great caution in investigations and should be entirely excluded from consideration in court."

See also 

 Criminology
 Forensic profiling
 Forensic psychology
 Presumption of guilt
 Racial profiling
 Residential Burglary Expert System
 Statistical correlations of criminal activity

References

Cited works and further reading
 
 Canter, David; Youngs, Donna (2008). Principles of Geographical Offender Profiling. New York: Ashgate Publishing. 
 Douglas, John; Olshaker, Mark (1997). Journey Into Darkness: The FBI's Premier Investigator Penetrates the Minds and Motives of the Most Terrifying Serial Killers. London: Arrow Books.

External links
 Criminal Investigative Research and Analysis (CiR&A) Group: Current research on evidence-based behavioural investigative practice in police investigations
 Swiss scientific research site on criminal profiling
 University of Liverpool Forensic Psychology – with articles
 History of Criminal Profiling – with links to other sites
 Offender Profiling: An Introduction to the Sociopsychological Analysis of Violent Crime 
 Dangerous Minds: Criminal profiling made easy, by Malcolm Gladwell

 
1888 establishments in England
Criminal investigation
English inventions
Forensic psychology
Law enforcement techniques
Pseudoscience